The SQL/Schemata, or Information and Definition Schemas, part of the SQL standard is defined by ISO/IEC 9075-11:2008. SQL/Schemata defines the information schema and definition schema, providing a common set of tools to make SQL databases and objects self-describing. SQL/Schemata defines a number of features, some of which are mandatory.

See also
 Data Definition Language (CREATE, ALTER, DROP...)
 SQL:2003 (Introduced SQL/Schemata)
 Data dictionary

References

External links

SQL